The Blackwood-Harwood Plantations Cemetery is a historic cemetery in Tallahassee, Florida, United States. It is located northeast of the junction of State Road 263 and I-10. On October 6, 1999, it was added to the U.S. National Register of Historic Places.

References

External links

 Leon County listings at National Register of Historic Places
 Florida's Office of Cultural and Historical Programs
 Leon County listings
 Blackwood-Harwood Plantations Cemetery

National Register of Historic Places in Tallahassee, Florida
Geography of Tallahassee, Florida
History of Leon County, Florida
Protected areas of Leon County, Florida
Plantations in Leon County, Florida